Finn Ivar Tveter (19 November 1947 – 30 July 2018) was a Norwegian jurist and Olympic rower.

He received a silver medal in coxless four at the 1976 Summer Olympics in Montreal, together with Ole Nafstad, Rolf Andreassen, and Arne Bergodd. He also competed at the 1972 Summer Olympics, and won a bronze medal at the 1970 World Championships.

By profession, Tveter was a jurist. He worked in the Norwegian Consumer Council, as a lawyer, and chaired the Bankklagenemnda from 1988 to 1997. From 1997 on he was the director of the Norwegian Association of Real Estate Agents.

Tveter grew up in Skøyen and Bøler, but at the time of his death resided in Haslum. He was married and has three daughters.

References

External links
 
 

1947 births
2018 deaths
Norwegian male rowers
Rowers at the 1972 Summer Olympics
Rowers at the 1976 Summer Olympics
Olympic rowers of Norway
Olympic silver medalists for Norway
Norwegian jurists
Rowers from Oslo
Olympic medalists in rowing
World Rowing Championships medalists for Norway
Medalists at the 1976 Summer Olympics